Siré Komara (born 1991) is a Guinean writer.

Komara, daughter of an international civil servant, left Guinea for Egypt at the age of three. She published the autobiographical Mes Racines at the age of 14. She also has published a comic book, Le Téléphone de Siré.

Works
 Mes Racines (My Roots), Paris: Cauris Editions, 2006.
 Le Téléphone de Siré, 2007

References

1991 births
Living people
Guinean writers
Guinean women writers
Women autobiographers
21st-century women writers
Female comics writers